Blairhill railway station serves the Blairhill area of Coatbridge, North Lanarkshire, Scotland. It is 8½ miles (13 km) east of Glasgow Queen Street railway station. Situated on Blair Road, the railway station is managed by ScotRail and is served by trains on the North Clyde Line, comprising Class 334s on Edinburgh to Helensburgh services, and Class 318s and Class 320s on Airdrie to Balloch services.

History 
The station was built opened on 1 February 1871 and was previously called Blairhill and Gartsherrie. It bordered the original St. Ambrose High School from 1961 until the buildings were demolished in 2012.

Facilities 
The street-level platform, which now bears the "portacabin" ticket office, once supported a wooden station building which housed a ticket office and newsagent. On the night of 12 January 1987, shortly after being painted in the bright orange livery of the Strathclyde Passenger Transport Executive, this building was burned to the ground.  The station now has a staffed ticket office during working hours (Monday-Saturday). A new purpose built car park on the site of the former St. Ambrose High School now serves the station.

Services 
Monday to Saturday daytimes:

Half-hourly service towards Edinburgh Waverley
Half-hourly service towards Airdrie 
Half-hourly service towards Balloch via Glasgow Queen Street Low Level
Half-hourly service towards Helensburgh Central via Glasgow Queen Street Low Level (As of August 2016 this service no longer calls at Shettleston, Cartyne and Bellgrove. Passengers for these stations please use the half-hourly service towards Balloch instead.)

Evening services are as follows: 
Half-hourly service towards Airdrie via all stations
Half-hourly service towards Balloch via Glasgow Queen Street Low Level

Sunday services are as follows: 
Half-hourly service towards Edinburgh Waverley 
Half-hourly service towards Helensburgh Central

Gallery

References

Notes

Sources 
 
 
 
 RAILSCOT on Coatbridge Branch

Railway stations in North Lanarkshire
Former North British Railway stations
Railway stations in Great Britain opened in 1871
Railway stations served by ScotRail
SPT railway stations
Coatbridge